, often shortened to  is a public high school, located in Warabi City, Saitama, Japan.

The number of applicants increased, and both like 7.57 times as for the magnification of the entrance exam of the previous term of fiscal year 2006 and 2.34 times as for the latter half of the year entrance exam were the best every year in the public high school school infantry in the saitama prefecture.

Location
The school is about a 20 minute walk from Warabi Station. It takes about 23 minutes to get there from Minami-Urawa station.
The school is surrounded by a residential dist

History
Temporary schoolhouse establishment on April 1, 1957 in present Warabi-city. The first entrance ceremony on April 15 of the same year was performed. This day was set as the school foundation day.

Extracurricular activities

Notable alumni

References
 http://www.warabi-h.spec.ed.jp/ Official school website

High schools in Saitama Prefecture
Schools in Saitama Prefecture
Educational institutions established in 1957
1957 establishments in Japan
Warabi, Saitama